The 2006 season of the Toppserien, the highest women's football (soccer) league in Norway, began on 6 May 2006 and ended on 28 October 2006.

18 games were played with 3 points given for wins and 1 for draws. Number nine and ten went to a playoff round with number three and four from the First Division. The two top teams from the First Division were promoted, as the league was expanded from 10 teams to 12 teams in 2007.

Kolbotn won the league after beating Trondheims-Ørn on goal difference.

League table

Top goalscorers
 19 goals:
  Elise Thorsnes, Arna-Bjørnar
  Tonje Hansen, Kolbotn
 16 goals:
  Elene Moseby, Team Strømmen
 14 goals:
  Una Nwajei, Amazon Grimstad
  Kristine Edner, Røa
 12 goals:
  Kristin Lie, Trondheims-Ørn
 11 goals:
  Trine Rønning, Kolbotn
  Guro Knutsen, Røa
  Solfrid Andersen, Trondheims-Ørn
 10 goals:
  Trude Amundsen, Sandviken
 9 goals:
  Madeleine Giske, Arna-Bjørnar
  Ingrid Camilla Fosse Sæthre, Arna-Bjørnar
  Kristin Blystad Bjerke, Kolbotn
  Linda Stadsøy, Røa
  Lene Mykjåland, Røa

Relegation play-offs
 The qualification matches were contested between Klepp (9th in the Toppserien), Liungen (10th in the Toppserien), Grand Bodø (3rd in the First Division), and Manglerud Star (4th in the First Division). Grand Bodø and Klepp won, and were respectively promoted to, and stayed in, the Toppserien. Liungen was relegated to the First Division.
Grand Bodø - Liungen     1–0
Manglerud Star - Klepp 0–1
Liungen - Grand Bodø     0–1
Klepp - Manglerud Star   4–0

References
League table
Fixtures
Playoff
Goalscorers

Toppserien seasons
Top level Norwegian women's football league seasons
1
Nor
Nor